Arrentières is a commune in the Aube department in the Grand Est region of north-central France.

Geography
Arrentières is located in the Côte des Bar between the communes of Montier-en-l'Isle and Engente. In a direct line the commune is 4.3 km north-east of Bar-sur-Aube, 33.9 km north-west of Chaumont and 49.3 km east of Troyes. The nearest large cities are Reims (123 km) and Dijon (107 km). Access to the commune is by the D384 road from Bar-sur-Aube in the south passing north through the western part of the commune west of the village and continuing to Soulaines-Dhuys in the north. The D13 also goes from Bar-sur-Aube through the south-east of the commune and continues north-east to Colombé-la-Fosse. Access to the village is by the D73 which branches off the D384 north of Bar-sur-Aube and passes through the village before continuing north-east to Beurville. The D102 branches off the D384 in the north of the commune and goes south-east through the village and continues to Voigny in the south-east. The commune has large areas of forest in the north with the southern part mostly farmland.

The commune lies on a limestone plateau with an area of 1,391 hectares and its altitude varying between 183m in the valley to 331m near the Vernonfays farm in the north.

The Vernet river flows from the north of the commune to join the Ruisseau de Cuvelots south of the village which then flows south to join the Bresse in the south-west. The Bresse flows from the east passing through the south of the commune and continuing west to join the Aube near Ailleville.

Neighbouring communes and villages

Toponymy
The following names have been attested:
Arrentières (or Arenterium/Arenthières) (1147)
Arentières (1793)
Arentière (1801)

It comes from a dialectal adjective arremier meaning "who owes money, who pays money".

History
The Orimont farm, located in the south-east of the commune was mentioned in 1148.

In the 12th century the lords of the village were the Commanderie de Thors whose origin dated back to the Knights Templar. During this same period, there was a priory at Arrentières of the Cistercian order. It was transferred to Chaumont during the late 17th century.

In the 14th century Jean d'Arrentières was appointed royal bailiff and served the Count of Bar. In 1371 he arrested Countess Yolande de Bar by order of Charles V and held her captive.

Heraldry

Policy and administration

Political trends and results
In the second round of the 2002 French presidential election, 76.32% of the votes were cast for Jacques Chirac (RPR) and 23.68% for Jean-Marie Le Pen (FN).

In the second round of the 2007 French presidential election, 81.18% of the votes were cast for Nicolas Sarkozy (UMP) and 18.82% for Ségolène Royal (PS) with a participation rate of 86.63%.<ref>
[http://www.interieur.gouv.fr/Elections/Les-resultats/Presidentielles/elecresult__presidentielle_2007/%28path%29/presidentielle_2007/021/010/10011.html Results of the 2007 presidential election], Ministry of Interior website, consulted on 1 March 2014 </ref>

In the second round of the 2012 French presidential election, 78.57% of the votes were cast for Nicolas Sarkozy (UMP) and 21.43% for François Hollande (PS), with a participation rate of 93.90%.

Municipal administration
As the number of inhabitants of the town is between 100 and 500, the number of council members is 11.

Administration

List of Successive Mayors

Judicial and administrative proceedings
Arrentières reports to the Tribunal d'instance of Troyes, the Tribunal de grande instance of Troyes, the  Court of Appeal of Reims, the juvenile court of Troyes, the industrial tribunal of Troyes, the Commercial Court of Troyes, the Administrative Court of Châlons-en-Champagne and the Administrative Court of Appeal of Nancy.

Environmental policy
Collection, recovery, and disposal of waste services are provided by the Community of communes of the Region of Bar-sur-Aube.

Local finance
From 2008 to 2013, the municipal administration has kept the net cash flow of capital repayments of loans at a better rate per capita than other communes of the same type:

Population

Distribution of age groups
The population of the commune is 53.7% men and 46.3% women. The following table compares the proportions of gender and age of the population of Arrentières in 2017 with that of Aube in the same year.

Percentage Distribution of Age Groups in Arrentières and Aube Department in 2017

Town planning
Housing
In 2017 the total number of dwellings in the commune was 135. Among these units 72.6% were primary residences, second homes 5.9% and 21.5% of vacant housing. These units were all single-family houses. The proportion of primary homes, properties of their occupants, was 88.8%.

Development projects
Development projects are administered by the Community of communes of the Region of Bar-sur-Aube. All 27 communes in the area collaborate to implement joint project development and spatial planning for each town and village.

Arrentières  was the first commune to have installed coloured candelabras (red) in the streets and, in 1995, one of the first small communes to be equipped with a sewerage treatment plant. An innovative collective project to heat all homes with wood has been designed but not implemented due to lack of funding. After the rehabilitation of roads, public lighting, water system and the church (Retable over the nave refurbished) over 3 years to 2010, the commune started the renovation of the hall as well as the walls of two lavoirs (public laundries).

Economy
In 2009, the active population aged 15–64 years was 96 people of which there were 4 unemployed. These workers are in majority employees (78%), and are in majority employed outside the commune (70%).

On 31 December 2015 Arrentières had 53 establishments: 40 in agriculture-forestry-fishing, two in industry, none in construction, 8 in various trade-transport-services, and 3 related to the administrative sector.

Although the commune has only 214 inhabitants (2017), there are no fewer than eight producers of champagne: the commune has 130 hectares in the Champagne AOC.

Sites and monuments
The Château d'Arrentières was built in the 13th century. The lodging and the towers were largely rebuilt in the late Middle Ages. Part of the building has been registered as a historical monument since 20 May 1994.

The Church of Saint Jacques contains many items listed on the inventory of historical monuments:

A Statue: Virgin and Child (16th century)
A Statuette: St. Jacques (18th century)
A Statue: Virgin and Child (18th century)
A Statuette: Saint Jacques (18th century)
An Altar cross (18th century)
Statue: Saint Roch (disappeared) (18th century)
A Retable, Tabernacle, and main altar step (18th century)
A Statue: holy bishop (16th century)
Tombstone of Jean de La Barre (16th century)
Tombstone of Hugues Gradey (16th century)
A Paten (19th century)
A Chalice (19th century)
An Eagle Lectern (17th century)
A Statue: Christ on the Cross (17th century)
A Painting: Martyrdom of Saint Sebastian (19th century)
A Chair (19th century)
An Altar Painting: Institution of the Rosary (19th century)
A Painting: Saint Antoine (19th century)
A Small bell (17th century)
A Processional Staff: Assumption (18th century)
Processional Staff: Saint Jacques (18th century)
Processional Staff: Saint Roch (disappeared) (18th century)
Tombstone of Jean de Rosières (16th century)
Processional Staff: Saint Nicolas (19th century)
The Furniture in the Church

Facilities
Education
Arrentières is located in the area of the Academy of Reims.

The commune administered an elementary school (cycle 1) with a class of 17 students in 2012–2013. This class was closed before the 2013–2014 school year and the commune integrated into an inter-communal educational regrouping (RPI) - the Syndicat Mixte Bresse Œillet.

The closest kindergarten is located at Colombé-la-Fosse and, since the 2013–2014 school year and within the cluster, the elementary school is located at Colombé-le-Sec. For secondary education students go to the Gaston Bachelard esatte at Bar-sur-Aube.

The difficulties of organizing classes in the inter-communal educational grouping were covered in the daily L'Est-Éclair in early 2014.

Cultural events and festivities
The "Route of champagne in celebration" is a major event that lasts two days. It took place in 2009 at Arrentières.

Health
There is no doctor or nurse working in Arrentières. The nearest doctor and hospital are in Bar-sur-Aube.

Sports
The commune has a football field. On 1 May 2013, for the second year, the cycling Star Baralbine organized a cycle race called Prize of Arrentières.Cycling - The Troyes cyclists dominate the Prize of Arrentières , 3 May 2013, L'Est-Éclair daily newspaper website, consulted on 5 March 2014 .

Media
The regional daily L'Est-Éclair provides local information on the commune.

The commune has no Main distribution frame for ADSL installed nor is it connected to a fibre optic network. Telephone lines are connected to exchanges located in Bar-sur-Aube and Ville-sur-Terre.

Worship
Only Catholic worship is celebrated in Arrentières. The commune is one of eleven grouped in the Parish of Bar-sur-Aube, one of the nine parishes of pastoral area of Côtes des Bar'' in the Diocese of Troyes. The place of worship is the parish church of Saint-Jacques-le-Majeur.

This church has three naves dedicated to Saint Jacques-le-Majeur which date from the 18th century. Its bell tower is inspired by that of the Church of Saint-Pierre of Bar-sur-Aube.

See also
Communes of the Aube department

Notes and references

Notes

References

External links

Arrentières on the old National Geographic Institute website 
Arrentières on Géoportail, National Geographic Institute (IGN) website 
Arenuere on the 1750 Cassini Map

Communes of Aube